Taya Hanson (born June 14, 2000) is a Canadian college basketball player for Oregon and a member of the Canada women's national basketball team. She previously played college basketball at Arizona State.

College career 
Hanson began her collegiate career at Arizona State. On January 1, 2021, she tied the ASU program record with seven three-pointers made in a game against California. She was subsequently named Canada Basketball’s Player of the Week for the week ending January 3, 2021. During the 2020–21 season in her junior year, she Led ASU in scoring (12.6), 3-pointers (62), steals (1.4) and free throw percentage (84.8), and ranked third in rebounding (4.3 rpg) and fourth in assists (1.4). She was subsequently named All-Pac-12 honorable mention and Pac-12 All-Defense honorable mention.

On March 29, 2022, Hanson announced she would enter the transfer portal. During her career at ASU she appeared in all 114 games while making 62 starts. She recorded 739 career points, 296 rebounds and 144 three-pointers made. On April 5, 2022, she announced she was transferring to Oregon for the 2022–23 season.

National team career 
Hanson has been a member of the Canada women's national basketball team since 2015. She first competed at the 2015 FIBA Americas U16 Championship and won a gold medal. She represented Canada at the 2018 FIBA Under-18 Women's Americas Championship where she averaged 11.5 points, 4.8 rebounds and 1.7 steals in six games and won a silver medal. On July 12, 2019, she was named to team Canada for the 2019 FIBA Under-19 Women's Basketball World Cup. She averaged 10.7 points in seven games.

On July 18, 2022, she was named to team Canada to compete at the 3x3 basketball tournament at the 2022 Commonwealth Games. She recorded 20 points and 23 rebounds in six games during the tournament and won a gold medal. On September 19, 2022, she was named to team Canada for the 2022 FIBA Women's Basketball World Cup.

References 

2000 births
Living people
Arizona State Sun Devils women's basketball players
Basketball people from British Columbia
Canadian expatriate basketball people in the United States
Canadian women's basketball players
Commonwealth Games competitors for Canada
Commonwealth Games gold medallists for Canada
Guards (basketball)
Sportspeople from Kelowna
Medallists at the 2022 Commonwealth Games